Cedar Hill may refer to:

Canada
Cedar Hill, a previous name of Mount Douglas, Saanich, Greater Victoria, British Columbia
Cedarhill Estate, Nepean, Ottawa, Ontario

United States

Populated places
Cedar Hill (New Haven), Connecticut, a neighborhood
Saint Benedict, Louisiana (also Cedar Hill), an unincorporated community
Cedar Hill, Missouri
Cedar Hill, North Carolina, an unincorporated community
Cedar Hill, Ohio, an unincorporated community
Cedar Hill, Tennessee
Cedar Hill, Texas
Cedar Hill, Frederick County, Virginia, an unincorporated community
Cedar Hill, Virginia (Pittsylvania County), an unincorporated community

Other
 Cedar Hill (Barstow, Maryland), a house listed on the NRHP
 Cedar Hill (Westover, Maryland), a house listed on the NRHP
Cedar Hill (Central Park), a hill in Central Park, New York City
Cedar Hill (Warwick, Rhode Island), a historic summer estate
 Cedar Hill (Buena Vista, Virginia), a house and farm listed on the NRHP
 Cedar Hill, Anacostia,  Washington, D.C., now known as Frederick Douglass National Historic Site
Cedar Hill Yard, a railroad yard in the Cedar Hill neighborhood of New Haven, Connecticut

See also
Cedar Hill Cemetery (disambiguation)
Cedar Hill School (disambiguation)
Cedar Hills (disambiguation)